Solmaris is a genus of diminutive hydrozoans.

References

Solmarisidae
Hydrozoan genera